Anthopotamus is a genus of hacklegilled burrower mayflies in the family Potamanthidae. There are at least four described species in Anthopotamus.

Species
 Anthopotamus distinctus (Traver, 1935)
 Anthopotamus myops (Walsh, 1863)
 Anthopotamus neglectus (Traver, 1935)
 Anthopotamus verticis (Say, 1839) (Walker's tusked sprawler)

References

Further reading

 

Mayfly genera
Mayflies